Robert Everett Allen Palmer II (1933 – March 11, 2006) was an historian and a leading figure in the study of archaic Rome. At the time of his death was professor emeritus of classical studies at the University of Pennsylvania.

Palmer earned both his B.A. (1953) and his Ph.D. (1956) from the Johns Hopkins University.

Palmer started his teaching career at the University of Illinois. He began his Penn career in 1961 as an assistant professor of classical studies and was promoted to associate professor in 1966, and professor in 1970.

Palmer was an historian of ancient Rome, with particular interests in Roman religion and epigraphy. He was the author of numerous articles and several books.  His most important research was a project on the neighborhoods (vici) of ancient Rome.

Palmer died at his home in Haverford, Pennsylvania at the age of 73.

Bibliography
 The king and the comitium: a study of Rome's oldest public document (1969).
 Roman Religion and Roman Empire (1974).
 The Archaic Community of the Romans (1970).
 Rome and Carthage at Peace (1997).

References
 University of Pennsylvania Almanac v. 52, no. 27 (28 March 2006).
 Obituary in The Philadelphia Inquirer

20th-century American historians
20th-century American male writers
American classical scholars
1933 births
2006 deaths
Classical scholars of the University of Pennsylvania
Historians of ancient Rome
Johns Hopkins University alumni
American male non-fiction writers